East Chambers Independent School District is a public school district based in the community of Winnie in unincorporated Chambers County, Texas (USA). The school colors are green and gold, and the mascot is the buccaneer.

The school district has four campuses: a primary, an elementary, junior high, and high school campus. These schools serve the communities of Winnie, Stowell, and Seabreeze.

In 2009, the school district was rated "academically acceptable" by the Texas Education Agency.

Gallery

References

External links
East Chambers ISD

School districts in Chambers County, Texas